Confessions Of Man is the third release from the rock group The Fifth and their first release with their new record label EMG/Universal Records. The album was originally released in 2008 under Infidel records.

Release
The album consist of 10 songs with the only single from the album with a music video is "The Gift (Take It Back)".

Track listing

References

The Fifth (band) albums
2009 albums